Louis Ken-Kwofie (6 February 1969 – 25 June 2022) was a Ghanaian professional footballer who played as a midfielder.

Early life
Ken-Kwofie attended Hudson Catholic High School.

Career

College career
Ken-Kwofie played college soccer with Montclair State.

Professional career
Ken-Kwofie played one game for the MetroStars, on loan from the New Jersey Stallions, during the 1996 season of Major League Soccer. During that same season, Ken-Kwofie also played for the Pennsylvania Natives, ironically against the MetroStars. Ken-Kwofie was still playing for the Stallions during the 1999 season. Ken-Kwofie also played in the Netherlands with Sparta Rotterdam.

Coaching career
Ken-Kwofie coached Ramapo College. He also coached youth soccer in New Jersey, including the North Cadwell Soccer Club.

He later coached at Hudson Catholic Regional High School in Jersey City.

Personal life and death
Ken-Kwofie died on 25 June 2022 following a battle with pancreatic cancer, aged 53.

References

External links
Player profile at Metro Fanatic

1969 births
2022 deaths
Association football midfielders
Deaths from pancreatic cancer
Expatriate footballers in the Netherlands
Expatriate soccer players in the United States
Ghanaian expatriate footballers
Ghanaian expatriate sportspeople in the Netherlands
Ghanaian expatriate sportspeople in the United States
Ghanaian footballers
Major League Soccer players
Montclair State University alumni
New Jersey Stallions players
New York Red Bulls players
Sparta Rotterdam players